This is a list of the main career statistics of Russian professional tennis player Maria Kirilenko. She has won six singles and 12 doubles titles on the WTA Tour. At the Grand Slams, in singles, she reached three different quarterfinals; the 2010 Australian Open, 2012 Wimbledon Championships and 2013 French Open, respectively. In doubles, she reached a couple of quarterfinals and semifinals, along with two finals (the 2011 Australian Open and 2012 French Open). On the WTA Rankings, in both competition, she entered top 10. In singles, she has No. 10 as her career-highest and No. 5 in doubles.

She also left her mark at the national competitions for Russia, reaching semifinals of the 2012 Summer Olympics in London, but lost bronze medal match to Victoria Azarenka. However, in doubles, she won bronze medal alongside Nadia Petrova. At the Fed Cup, in 2011, with her Russian team, she reached final but lost to Czech Republic 2–3. Her biggest title in doubles is the 2012 WTA Tour Championships that she won alongside her compatriot Petrova.

Performance timelines
Only main-draw results in WTA Tour, Grand Slam tournaments, Fed Cup and Olympic Games are included in win–loss records.

Singles

Doubles

Grand Slam finals

Doubles: 2 runner-ups

Other significant finals

Olympics finals

Singles: 1 bronze medal match (0–1)

Doubles: 1 bronze medal match (1–0)

Year-end championships finals

Doubles: 1 (1 title)

WTA Premier Mandatory & 5 finals

Doubles: 7 (3 titles, 4 runner-ups)

WTA career finals

Singles: 12 (6 titles, 6 runner-ups)

Doubles: 25 (12 titles, 13 runner-ups)

WTA Tour career earnings 
{|cellpadding=3 cellspacing=0 border=1 style=border:#aaa;solid:1px;border-collapse:collapse;text-align:center;
|-style=background:#eee;font-weight:bold
|width="90"|Year
|width="100"|Grand Slam <br/ >titles'|width="100"|WTA <br/ >titles
|width="100"|Total <br/ >titles
|width="120"|Earnings ($)
|width="100"|Money list rank
|-
|2003
|0
|0
|0
| align="right" |55,550
|155
|-
|2004
|0
|1
|1
| align="right" |107,444
|112
|-
|2005
|0
|2
|2
| align="right" |382,559
|35
|-
|2006
|0
|0
|0
| align="right" |431,467
|31
|-
|2007
|0
|2
|2
| align="right" |451,756
|34
|-
|2008
|0
|5
|5
| align="right" |455,770
|39
|-
|2009
|0
|1
|1
| align="right" |444,704
|50
|-
|2010
|0
|2
|2
| align="right" |912,925
|21
|-
|2011
|0
|2
|2
| align="right" |1,001,417
|16
|-
|2012
|0
|2
|2
| align="right" |1,327,054
|14
|-
|2013
|0
|1
|1
| align="right" |995,357
|20
|-
|2014*
|0
|0
|0
| align="right" |230,216
|>100
|-
|Career*
|0
|18
|18
| align="right" |6,526,615
|43
|}
*As of Feb 28, 2013

Fed Cup participations

Singles (5)

Doubles (2)

Record against other players

Record against top 10 playersKirilenko's record against players who have been ranked in the top 10. Active players are in boldface.''

No. 1 wins

Top 10 wins

Notes

References

External links
 
 
 

Kirilenko, Maria